The Squaw Creek Southern Railroad (reporting mark SCS) is a Class III railroad subsidiary of Respondek Railroad operating in the southern portion of the State of Indiana. Originally, the Squaw Creek Southern started operating 21 miles of former Yankeetown Dock Corporation/Peabody Coal trackage owned by Norfolk Southern, but has since started servicing Foresight Energy's Sitran Coal Terminal near Evansville, Indiana and SABIC's Innovative Plastics plant in Mount Vernon, Indiana.

History
In 2003, Norfolk Southern bought 21.6 miles of former Peabody Coal Company/Yankeetown Dock Corporation (AMAX Coal) trackage and spurs from Lynnville, Indiana, to Yankeetown Indiana. In 2007, the Squaw Creek Southern acquired trackage rights from Norfolk Southern from 0.0 BY (Yankeetown) and 21.6 BY (Lynnville Mine), and since then, has done the loading at Alcoa's Liberty Mine north of Boonville, and unloading at Alcoa's Warrick Operations, as well as Yankeetown Docks.

Locomotive Roster

 RRC 11, EMD SD35 rebuild from EMD SDP35
 RRC 20, EMD SD38-2
 RRC 21, EMD SD38-2 
 RRC 204 EMD SD9 Former Algers, Winslow and Western Railway #204
 RRC 415 EMD GP7 Former Peabody Coal #415
 RRC 1001 EMD GP7 Former Peabody Coal #1001
 RRC 4139 EMD GP7 

 the railroad also had a single EMD SD40T-2, 8795, which is currently operated by the Wheeling And Lake Erie Railway.

See also

Port Harbor Railroad - Sister Company

References

External links
 Squaw Creek Southern Website 
 Respondek Railroad Website
 Photos of Respondek Railroad Corporation locomotives

Indiana railroads